Shrawan Kumar may refer to:

 Shrawan Kumar (geneticist), Indian-American geneticist
 Shrawan Kumar (mathematician) (born 1953), Indian-American mathematician
 Shrawan Kumar (politician) (born 1957), Indian politician